The 2018 North Carolina Tar Heels football team represented the University of North Carolina at Chapel Hill as a member of Coastal Division of the Atlantic Coast Conference (ACC) during the 2018 NCAA Division I FBS football season. The Tar Heels were led by seventh-year head coach Larry Fedora and played their home games at Kenan Memorial Stadium. They finished the season 2–9 overall and 1–7 in ACC play to place last out of seven teams in the Coastal Division.

On November 25, one day after the conclusion of the season, Fedora was fired. He finished at North Carolina with a seven year record of 45–43. On November 27, the school rehired Mack Brown, who had previously helmed the program from 1988 to 1997, as head coach.

Previous season
The Tar Heels finished the 2017 season 3–9 overall and 1–7 in ACC play to place last in the Coastal Division.

Preseason

Award watch lists
Listed in the order that they were released

ACC media poll
The ACC media poll was released on July 24, 2018.

Schedule
The Tar Heels' schedule was released on January 17, 2018.

Game summaries

at California

at East Carolina

Pittsburgh

at Miami (FL)

Virginia Tech

at Syracuse

at Virginia

Georgia Tech

at Duke

Western Carolina

NC State

2019 NFL Draft

References

North Carolina
North Carolina Tar Heels football seasons
North Carolina Tar Heels football